Ashford College is a further education college in Ashford, Kent founded in August 2014. It has been run by EKC Group since April 2020, when it was acquired from the West Kent and Ashford College corporation. Susan Bonett became Principal of the College in 2021, replacing Victoria Copp-Crawley. Its campus is situated on Elwick Road with work to expand the facilities beginning in 2022 after receiving substantial government funds.

The college offers full and part-time qualifications, from vocational BTEC and NVQ Diplomas, to Access to HE courses, Apprenticeships and Higher Education programmes. The college is also an early pioneer of the T Level qualifications, with the first courses running from September 2022. 

The campus has a multi-media learning resource centre, engineering workshops, photography studios and darkrooms as well as commercial hair and beauty salons offering treatments to students, staff and the general public.

Ashford College relocated from its original location on Jemmett Road to Elwick Road in September 2017 after a £26 million construction project. The current campus accommodates over 1000 students but will cater for an additional 250 once Phase 2 is built.

A state-of-the-art recording studio was launched in June 2018, available to students and public hire. The 40-channel facility was officially opened by Eastenders star Shaun Williamson.

History

Ashford College was founded in 2014 as a result of the split of K College. Prior to this, the Jemmett Road campus was part of South Kent College. Following a 2008 KPMG report that recommended a merger, South Kent College joined West Kent College in April 2010 to form South & West Kent College, which traded as K College. The college campus location has changed from Jemmett Road, to Elwick Road after a new, multi-million pound campus was built.

It was announced in November 2021 that Ashford College's bid for the government's Post-16 Capacity Fund had been successful. The multi-million pound injection was to increase capacity by 250 students through the eventual completion of the College's 'Phase 2' development. This will see an additional wing constructed to house Information Technology, Engineering and Business classrooms alongside extended College administration facilities.

Courses

The college offers a number of full and part-time qualifications, from vocational BTEC and NVQ Diplomas, to Access to HE courses, Apprenticeships and Higher Education programmes, alongside short courses, in subjects such as:

 Engineering
 Early Years
 Health and Social Care
 Catering and Hospitality
 Information Technology
 Construction: Electrical Installation, Plumbing, Gas
 Music Technology  
 Photography
 Art and Design
 Supporting Teaching and Learning
 Beauty Therapy, Hair Design
 Business and Accounting
 ESOL
 GCSE English and Maths

It was announced in 2021 that the vocational T Level Qualifications would also be introduced to Ashford College with the first courses beginning in September 2022.

References

External links

Further education colleges in Kent
Educational institutions established in 2014
2014 establishments in England
Ashford, Kent